"My Pony Boy" is a popular song written in 1909 by Bobby Heath (lyrics) and Charley O'Donnell. It was incorporated into the Broadway musical Miss Innocence (1909) where it was introduced by Lillian Lorraine.

Description
Along with songs like "Cheyenne", it became a cliché, as its tune was frequently used in Western movies and cartoons. It works especially well when played on a "honky tonk" piano.

The first verse explains that the central character of the song has many female admirers; the second that the "Fluffy Ruffle girl" has won his heart. The chorus:

Pony Boy, Pony Boy
Won't you be my Tony boy

Don't say no
Here we go
Off across the plains

Marry me
Carry me
Right away with you

Giddy up, giddy up, giddy up, whoa!
My Pony Boy

The old expression "giddy up", exhorting a horse to gallop at high speed, is a corruption of "get ye up". "Tony" is a hypocorism (affectionate shortened version) of "Anthony", although the adjective "tony" refers to someone of high "tone" or social elegance.

In the 1931 Krazy Kat short Rodeo Dough, a female spaniel sings the song after Krazy wins a rodeo event.
In the 1950s, The song was used in a commercial selling a juice concentrate also called Pony Boy.

Recordings
Ada Jones recorded it for Victor Records # 16356 in August 1909.

Peerless Quartet recorded for Columbia Records (catalog No. 713) in May 1909.

Bing Crosby included the song in a medley on his album On the Happy Side (1962).

Bruce Springsteen included a modified version as the last song on his 1992 album Human Touch.

Bibliography
Heath, Bobbie; O'Donnell, Charlie. "My Pony Boy" (sheet music). New York: Jerome H. Remick & Co. (1909).

References

External links
 Complete lyrics, MIDI, history and versions
 Original sheet music
 Recording by Ada Jones and a quarter

1909 songs
American popular music
Children's songs
Songs about cowboys and cowgirls
Western music (North America)